Vanya Marinova (born 22 October 1950) is a retired Bulgarian gymnast. She competed at the 1968 Summer Olympics in all artistic gymnastics events with the best result of 33rd place on the floor; her team finished eighth.

References

1950 births
Living people
Gymnasts at the 1968 Summer Olympics
Olympic gymnasts of Bulgaria
Bulgarian female artistic gymnasts